The Obva (Russian: Обва) – is a river in Perm Krai, Russia, a right tributary of the Kama. It starts in the Upper Kama Upland, in the west part of Sivinsky District, near the border of Kirov oblast. It flows into Kama Reservoir,  from the confluence of the Kama and the Volga. The Obva is frozen from late October to late April or early May.

References

Rivers of Perm Krai